Phyllocnistis loxosticha is a moth of the family Gracillariidae. It is known to be from Uganda.

References

Phyllocnistis
Endemic fauna of Uganda
Insects of Uganda
Moths of Africa